Madhuca sandakanensis is a tree in the family Sapotaceae. It is named for Sandakan in Borneo.

Description
The twigs are pale yellowish green. Inflorescences bear up to five flowers.

Distribution and habitat
Madhuca sandakanensis is endemic to Borneo. Its habitat is mixed dipterocarp forest from  altitude.

Conservation
Madhuca sandakanensis has been assessed as vulnerable on the IUCN Red List. The species is threatened by logging and conversion of land for palm oil plantations.

References

sandakanensis
Endemic flora of Borneo
Trees of Borneo
Plants described in 1960